Anorexia may refer to:

Eating conditions 
 Anorexia (symptom), the symptom of poor appetite whatever the cause
 Anorexia nervosa, an eating disorder of excessive weight loss and usually undue concern about body shape
 Anorexia mirabilis, people who would starve themselves, sometimes to death, for the sake of piety

Music 
 Anorexia Nervosa (band), a French symphonic black metal band
 Anorexia Nervosa, a two-part album by the band Showbread
 Anorexia (album)
 Nervosa (album)

Other uses 
 Sexual anorexia, a lack of "appetite" for romantic-sexual interaction

See also
 Anorectic
 Hunger strike

ar:فقدان الشهية
de:Anorexie
ka:ანორექსია
sw:Anoreksia
ru:Анорексия